Kirkstall power station was a coal-fired unit opened in 1930, serving the city of Leeds, West Yorkshire, England.

It was situated in Kirkstall by the River Aire north west of Leeds and had its own wharf for delivery of coal via the Leeds and Liverpool Canal.

History
The City of Leeds Corporation purchased the 104 acre (42.1 ha) Kirkstall site in 1926. Construction began in 1928, and the first electricity was generated in October 1930. The station was equipped with two British Thomson-Houston 25 MW turbo-alternators. An additional 30 MW turbo-alternator was ordered from BTH in 1935. By 1948, further extensions to the site had increased its combined generating capacity to around 200 MW. The station was later partly converted to oil firing during 1964, which rendered the coal sidings and associated shunters redundant.

The boilers were pulverised fuel and oil fired. There were 9 water tube Stirling/ International Combustion boilers working at 490 psi; in the 1947-48 extension there were International Combustion boilers operating at 650 psi. They were capable of delivering 2,370,000 lb/h (29.9 kg/s) of steam at 450 & 600 psi (31.0 & 41.4 bar) and 382/454 °C. The generating capacity in 1972 was 200 MW from five 30 MW turbo-alternators. Steam condensing and cooling was by river water and concrete cooling towers, each tower was rated at 2.5 million gallons per hour. In the year ending 31 March 1972 its load factor (the average load as a percent of maximum output capacity) was 20.5 percent.

The electricity output of the power station is shown in the tables. These comprised the HP plant with an installed capacity of 57 MW and the LP plant with an installed capacity of 133 MW.

Kirkstall Power Station was closed in 1976 and was subsequently demolished, the cooling towers were demolished in 1979. None of the structure remains. The  majority of the power station site is covered by a secure caravan storage depot, golf course and artificial football pitches with the rest of the site now forming part of the Kirkstall Valley Nature Reserve. The wharf used to unload coal is now a marina for canal and pleasureboats.

The major substations adjacent to the former power station still remain, supplying electrical power to much of Burley, Kirkstall, Armley and Bramley.

Incidents
In March 1950 there were reports that grit and dirt had been discharged from the chimneys of Kirkstall Power Station. The matter was raised in Parliament and the Minister of Fuel and Power replied that the British Electricity Authority had been making alterations to the plant, which should reduce the nuisance. These included new electrostatic precipitators and ash handing plant.

In July 1956 scaffolding had been erected on a 320 ft chimney at the station. The scaffolding collapsed and four men fell 200 ft, one was killed and three badly injured.

See also

 Skelton Grange Power Station

References

External links
Picture of Kirkstall Power station in 1970
Kirkstall Valley Nature Reserve.

Coal-fired power stations in England
Power stations in Yorkshire and the Humber
Former power stations in England
Demolished power stations in the United Kingdom
Buildings and structures in Leeds